Anastasiia Pidpalova (born Anastasiia Borodina, 5 January 1982) is a Ukrainian handballer playing for Le Havre and the Ukrainian national team.

Individual awards 
 Carpathian Trophy Top Scorer: 2010

She received a bronze medal with the Ukrainian national team at the 2004 Summer Olympics in Athens.

References

Sportspeople from Kherson
1982 births
Living people
Ukrainian female handball players
Expatriate handball players
Ukrainian expatriate sportspeople in Romania
Ukrainian expatriate sportspeople in Russia
Ukrainian expatriate sportspeople in France
SCM Râmnicu Vâlcea (handball) players
Handball players at the 2004 Summer Olympics
Olympic bronze medalists for Ukraine
Olympic medalists in handball
Medalists at the 2004 Summer Olympics
Recipients of the Honorary Diploma of the Cabinet of Ministers of Ukraine